Mirissa is a small town on the south coast of Sri Lanka, located in the Matara District of the Southern Province. Mirissa's beach and nightlife make it a popular tourist destination. It is also a fishing port and one of the island's main whale and dolphin watching locations.

History
Mirissa is the largest fishing port on the south coast and is known for its tuna, mullet, snapper, and butterfish. In 1980 the first tourist accommodation was built, and in the mid-1990s tourism to the town started to increase dramatically.

Mirissa was affected by the tsunami caused by the 2004 Indian Ocean earthquake, with numerous homes, guesthouses, shops, schools, and temples destroyed or damaged and fourteen reported deaths.

Transport
Mirissa is located on the A2 Highway, connecting Colombo to Wellawaya. 

Facilities
 Mirissa Boat Harbour
 Mirissa railway station

Attractions
 Mirissa beach and Coconut Tree Hill
 Whale Watching
 Sri Sunandarama Temple

See also
 List of towns in Southern Province, Sri Lanka
 List of beaches in Sri Lanka

References

Populated places in Matara District
Populated places in Southern Province, Sri Lanka
Seaside resorts in Sri Lanka